Lewis Dodd (born 27 January 2002) is an English professional rugby league footballer who plays as a  for St Helens in the Betfred Super League.

Background

Dodd was Born in Widnes, England. He is of Welsh  descent.

Playing career
He signed for Saints Academy in 2017 from amateur team, Halton Hornets.

St Helens
Lewis made his first team début for St Helens (Heritage № 1253) on 29 September 2020, coming off the substitutes’ bench in the second-half to fill the  role, when James Roby left the field, in the Super League XXV 42-0 defeat of Wigan Warriors. Wigan were fielding a weakened side, giving débuts to a number of young players, in advance of their Challenge Cup semi-final draw in a few days.

Dodd played for St. Helens in their 2021 Super League Grand Final victory over Catalans Dragons.  It was the club's third successive championship victory in a row.
Following St Helens Good Friday victory over Wigan in the 2022 Super League season, it was revealed that Dodd would miss the remainder of the year after suffering an achilles injury.

In the 2023 World Club Challenge, Dodd kicked the match-winning field goal in golden point extra time to give St Helens a 13–12 victory over 2022 NRL premiers the Penrith Panthers, and their first World Club Challenge title since 2007.

References

External links
St Helens profile

2002 births
Living people
English rugby league players
Rugby league hookers
Rugby league players from St Helens, Merseyside
St Helens R.F.C. players